The Medvezhye gas field is a natural gas field located in the Yamalo-Nenets Autonomous Okrug. It was discovered in 1967 and developed by Gazprom. It began production in 1972 and produces natural gas and condensates. The total proven reserves of the Medvezhye gas field are around 83 trillion cubic feet (2370 km³), and production is slated to be around 4.89 Billion cubic feet/day (140×105m³) in 2013.

References

Natural gas fields in Russia
Natural gas fields in the Soviet Union